Wilmer Dale Elfrink (December 27, 1893 – September 22, 1948) was an American football and basketball coach.

Playing career
Elfrink played sports while attending Coe College in Cedar Rapids, Iowa. He was a key player on the football team of 1914 under head coach Moray Eby that the college considers to be one of the best teams the school fielded of all time.

Coaching career

Wichita State
Elfrink was the 12th head football coach at Fairmount College—known as now Wichita State University—Wichita, Kansas, serving for one season, in 1920 season, and compiling a record of 3–4–2. He also served that academic year as head basketball coach, leading his team to a record of 16–2.

UC Davis
The next year, Elfrink became the head football coach at the University Farm—now known as the University of California, Davis—for the 1921 season.

Head coaching record

Football

References

1893 births
1948 deaths
Basketball coaches from Iowa
Coe Kohawks football players
Des Moines Tigers football coaches
People from Cherokee, Iowa
UC Davis Aggies football coaches
UC Davis Aggies men's basketball coaches
Wichita State Shockers football coaches
Wichita State Shockers men's basketball coaches